The Chongtong (Hangul: 총통, Hanja: 銃筒) was a term for military firearms of Goryeo and Joseon dynasty. The size of chongtong varies from small firearm to large cannon, and underwent upgrades, which can be separated in three generation type. The well-known "Cheonja", "Jija", "Hyeonja", and "Hwangja" were named after the first four characters of the Thousand Character Classic in decreasing size, thus making them equivalent to Cannons A, B, C, and D.

History

Gunpowder first came to Korea in the mid 14th century. From 1356 onwards Korea was much harassed by Japanese wo khou pirates, and the Goryeo king, Kongmin Wang, sent an envoy to the Ming court appealing for a supply of firearms. Although China at that time was under Yuan dynasty, the first Ming emperor, Chu Yuan-Chang seems to have treated the request kindly and responded in some measure. The Goryeosa mentions a certain type of bombard (ch'ong t'ong) which could send arrows from the Nam-kang hill to the south of the Sun-ch’on Sa temple with such force and velocity that they would penetrate completely into the ground together with their fins. In ca. 1372 Li Khang (or Li Yuan), a saltpetre expert (yen hsiao chiang), perhaps a merchant, came from South China to Korea, and he was befriended by the courtier Choi Muson. He asked him confidentially about the secrets of his mystery, and sent several of his retainers to learn his arts from him. Choi became the first Korean to manufacture gunpowder and gun barrels, all depending on Li Khang's transmission. A royal inspection of a new fleet happened in 1373 including tests of guns with larger barrels for shooting incendiary arrows against the pirate ships.

In 1373 a new mission, led by Sang Sa-on was sent to the Chinese capital asking for urgent supplies of gunpowder. The Koreans had built special ships for repelling the Japanese pirates, and these needed gunpowder for their cannon. In the following year another request was made to the Ming emperor after the military camps at Happo were set ablaze by Japanese pirates, with over 5000 casualties. At first Thai Tsu was reluctant to supply powder and arms to the Koreans, but in the middle of 1374 he changed his mind, he also sent military officers to inspect the ships built by the Koreans. The Goryeosa records the first systematic manufacture of hand-cannons and bombards in Korea in ca. 1377, saying that the arsenal was directed by a "Fire-Barrel Superintendent" (Huo Thung Tu Chien).

During the reign of Taejong of Joseon, improvements were made, and still more were made by Sejong the Great in the 1440s.

During the mid 16th century the classic Cheonja, Jija, Hyeonja and Hwangja chongtong appeared. Earlier in the century, the bullanggi, a breech-loading swivel gun was introduced from Portugal via China.

In 1596, more improvements were made, and by this time (i.e. on the dawn of the Imjin War) the Seungja class of hand-cannons were phased out in favor of Japanese-style muskets and arquebuses. The Koreans called these jochong (조총/鳥銃).

During the 1650s, Hendrick Hamel and others were shipwrecked on Jejudo, introducing a Dutch cannon the Koreans called the hong'ipo, and used it alongside the native Korean cannons.

They were finally discontinued in the late 19th century when Joseon abolished the old-style army in favor of an army based on contemporary Western militaries.

Cannons

Cheonja-Chongtong
The 'Sky' or 'Heaven' (Hangul: 천자총통; Hanja: 天字銃筒) type cannon was the largest of the chongtong. Its length was about 1.3 m and the bore was about 13 cm. One of the projectiles it fired was a 30 kg 'daejanggunjeon', a large rocket-shaped arrow with an iron head and fins. The cheonja could fire one of these up to about 1.4 km.

Jija-Chongtong
The 'Earth' (Hangul: 지자총통; Hanja: 地字銃筒) cannon was a little smaller, about 1 m long with a bore of about 10 cm. It could fire a 16.5 kg 'janggunjeon' (similar to the daejanggunjeon, only smaller) about 1 km.

Hyeonja-Chongtong
The 'Black' (Hangul: 현자총통; Hanja: 玄字銃筒) type was about 0.8 m long with a bore of about 8 cm and could fire a 'chadajeon' (similar to the janggunjeon) that weighed about 3.5 kg up to about 1 to 2 km.

Hwangja-Chongtong
The 'Yellow' (Hangul: 황자총통; Hanja: 黃字銃筒) was the smallest of the cannons. It resembled the European hand-cannon. Its bore was about 5 cm and shot a large arrow (similar to the chadaejeon) that weighed about 1.5 kg or four ordinary arrows at once which had a range of about 730 m.

Handheld guns

Se-Chongtong
In 1432, the Joseon dynasty under the reign of Sejong the Great introduced a handgun named se-chongtong (세총통). Initially, Joseon considered the gun as a failed project due to its short effective range, but the weapon quickly proved to be effective in the frontier provinces, starting in June 1437. It was used by both soldiers of different units and civilians, including women and children, as a personal defense weapon. The gun was notably used by chetamja (체탐자, special reconnaissance), whose mission was to infiltrate enemy territory, and by carabiniers carrying multiple guns (a fact made possible by their compact size).

Seungja-Chongtong
The 'Victor' (Hangul: 승자총통; Hanja: 勝者銃筒) fired various small projectiles like pellets, bullets, arrows, arrows with war head, etc.

Gallery

Other firearms used by Koreans in the 16th century

Similar weapons 

 Cetbang, Javanese cannon adapted from the Yuan guns
 Bo-hiya, Japanese fire arrow
 Huochong, Chinese hand cannon
 Bedil tombak, Nusantaran hand cannon

See also
 List of artillery
 Korean cannon
 Hwacha
 Hongyipao
 Singijeon

References

Cannon
Weapons of Korea
Joseon dynasty
Early firearms
Early rocketry